The Ultimate Fighting Championship Part II (later renamed UFC 2: No Way Out) was a mixed martial arts (MMA) event held by the Ultimate Fighting Championship on March 11, 1994, at Mammoth Gardens in Denver, Colorado. The event was seen live on pay-per-view in the United States, and was later released on home video.

History
UFC 2 featured a sixteen-man tournament format, the first and only one in UFC history, with the winner receiving $60,000. The first seven bouts were not aired on the live pay-per-view broadcast nor were they on the home video version (VHS). The tournament had no weight classes or weight limits. Matches had no time limit or rounds, therefore no judges were used. Competitors could only win a match by submission, by the opponent's corner throwing in the towel, or by knockout.

UFC 2 marked the debut of referee John McCarthy, arguably the most famous referee in the sport of MMA. Since this was the only 16-man tournament in UFC history, Royce Gracie is the only person to have ever fought and won four fights in one night in the UFC.

Stuntman and co-creator of the UFC Ben Perry joined the announcing crew for the first time in UFC 2. He was quoted that evening as introducing Scott Morris into the ring by saying: "We don’t know much about Scott Morris, because he is a Ninja". This event did a buyrate of 300,000.

Results

UFC 2 bracket

1 Frank Hamaker was forced to withdraw due to injury. He was replaced by Fred Ettish.

See also 
 Ultimate Fighting Championship
 List of UFC champions
 List of UFC events
 1994 in UFC

References

External links
 UFC 2 results at Sherdog.com
 UFC 2 fights reviews
 Official UFC website
 

Ultimate Fighting Championship events
1994 in mixed martial arts
Mixed martial arts in Colorado
Sports competitions in Denver
1994 in sports in Colorado